French River, Nova Scotia may refer to:

 French River, Colchester County
 French River, Pictou County
 French River, Victoria, Nova Scotia